Alex Kennedy (born February 2, 1992) is an American professional stock car racing driver.

Racing career
After starting in Legends car racing, Kennedy returned to win the 2009 Legends Road Course World Finals.

NASCAR
As 16-year-old in 2008, he ran occasional races in a variety of national touring series; ARCA, NASCAR K&N Pro Series West, and the NASCAR K&N Pro Series East. In 2009, he ran full-time in the NASCAR K&N Pro Series East and finished tenth in the season points with three Top 10s and one Top 5 finish. He made his first Nationwide Series start in 2010, racing in six races, primarily on road courses. He raced in five Nationwide races in the following year with a top finish of 21st. At Dover that year, Kennedy became involved in a controversial incident, where his car pulled across the track when attempting to rejoin the field after an accident and hit the car of Kevin Swindell.

Kennedy made his Sprint Cup Series debut in the 2013 Toyota/Save Mart 350 at Sonoma Raceway for Humphrey Smith Racing. Kennedy is the first New Mexico native to compete in a Sprint Cup race since Al Unser Jr. qualified for the 1993 Daytona 500. Kennedy also competed for Humphrey Smith Racing later in the year at Pocono Raceway and Watkins Glen International.

Kennedy ran a number of Cup races in 2014 for Circle Sport Racing. He returned to Circle Sport for 2015, also declaring for Rookie of the Year. With his team closing down due to the charter system, he left with no ride for the 2016 season. He was later picked up by Premium Motorsports to drive the No. 55 Chevrolet at Watkins Glen.

Images

Motorsports career results

NASCAR
(key) (Bold – Pole position awarded by qualifying time. Italics – Pole position earned by points standings or practice time. * – Most laps led.)

Sprint Cup Series

Xfinity Series

 Season still in progress 
 Ineligible for series points

K&N Pro Series East

K&N Pro Series West

ARCA Racing Series
(key) (Bold – Pole position awarded by qualifying time. Italics – Pole position earned by points standings or practice time. * – Most laps led.)

References

External links

 
 

Living people
1992 births
People from Aztec, New Mexico
Racing drivers from New Mexico
NASCAR drivers
ARCA Menards Series drivers